Up The Dose / You Axed for It! is a compilation album by The Mentors, released in 1989. The album was the first release by the Mentors on CD, and collects the tracks from the albums You Axed for It! and Up the Dose, although two tracks from each had to be omitted due to length limitations of the CD format. The omitted tracks were later restored when the albums were released on CD in 1997 by Maximum Metal.

Track listing

External links 
 Up the Dose / You Axed for It! at Discogs

1989 compilation albums